Todd Hido (born 25 August 1968) is an American photographer. He has produced 17 books, had his work exhibited widely and included in various public collections. Hido is currently an adjunct professor at the California College of the Arts in San Francisco.

Life and work
Hido was born August 25, 1968, in Kent, Ohio, and graduated from Theodore Roosevelt High School in 1986. He graduated in 1991 with a B.F.A. from Tufts University, in Medford, Massachusetts and School of the Museum of Fine Arts, Boston. Between 1991 and 1992 he studied at Rhode Island School of Design, Providence, Rhode Island. In 1996 he gained an M.F.A. from California College of Arts and Crafts, Oakland, California. Among his professors was the photographer Larry Sultan, who will later become his mentor.

Much of Hido's earlier work involves photographs of urban and suburban housing across the U.S.. Hido accidentally approached what would be one of his best-known themes, when driving at night on the West Coast, he started photographing houses in different neighborhoods. The houses often seemed isolated and had mostly in common the presence of a window with the light on. From this research it came his book House Hunting, published in 2001.

He then started to include figures, mostly female nudes in interiors, and also to depict rural landscapes. In 2006 he published the monograph Between The Two. Hido combines interior photos and portraits taken of models and actresses, maintaining an aesthetic similar to that of its first publication. Also in this book there are night shots of buildings. No text or description were inserted, so as to leave the viewer total freedom of interpretation. In 2018, he released Bright Black World, his first work photographed outside the U.S. with environmental overtones.

Hido says he is influenced by Alfred Hitchcock, Edward Hopper, Stephen Shore, Robert Adams, Walker Evans, Nan Goldin, Emmet Gowin, Larry Sultan, Alfred Stieglitz, Andreas Gursky and Rineke Dijkstra. Commissioned by Italian brand Bottega Veneta, he photographed actress Lauren Hutton as well as models Joan Smalls and Vittoria Ceretti for the brand's spring/summer 2017 advertisements.

Publications

Publications by Hido
 House Hunting.
 Portland, OR: Nazraeli, 2001. .
 Portland, OR: Nazraeli, 2007. .
 Outskirts. Portland, OR: Nazraeli, 2002. . Text by Lucy Sante. Edition of 2000 copies.
 Taft Street. One Picture Book 6. Portland, OR: Nazraeli, 2001. .
 Roaming. Portland, OR: Nazraeli, 2004.  Edition of 3000 copies.
 Between the Two. Portland, OR: Nazraeli, 2006. . Edition of 2000 copies.
 Crooked Cracked Tree in Fog. One Picture Book 60. Portland, OR: Nazraeli, 2009. . Edition of 500 copies.
 Ohio. TBW Subscription Series #2. Oakland, CA: TBW, 2009. . Edition of 800 copies. The other volumes are by Abner Nolan, Marianne Mueller and Alec Soth.
 A Road Divided. Portland, OR: Nazraeli, 2010. .
 Nymph Daughters. Kamakura: Super Labo, 2010. . Edition of 500 copies.
 Excerpts from Silver Meadows. Portland, OR: Nazraeli, 2013. 
 Todd Hido on Landscapes, Interiors, and the Nude. The Photography Workshop Series. New York: Aperture, 2014. . With an introduction by Gregory Halpern.
 B-Sides – Silver Meadows. Portland, OR: Nazraeli, 2014. . Edition of 500 copies. 50 individual cards in a clear plexi box, similar to a pack of playing cards.
 Khrystyna's World. Amsterdam: Reflex Amsterdam, 2015. . Edition of 500 copies. Published on the occasion of the exhibition, Todd Hido: Selections from a Survey: Khrystyna's World, 2015, Reflex Amsterdam, Amsterdam. With an essay by Katya Tylevich, "Khrystyna's World: Detention in the Getaway Car".
 Seasons Road. One Picture Book 93. Portland, OR: Nazraeli, 2016. . Edition of 500 copies. 7 colour plates and 1 photographic print. "Every year at Christmas for the past ten years, Todd Hido has traveled to Ohio to visit his parents. During his annual trip home, Hido makes photographs along the small road that serves as the namesake for this book."
 Intimate Distance: Twenty-five Years of Photographs, A Chronological Album. New York: Aperture, 2016. . With an essay by David Campany.
 B-Sides Box Sets – Homing In. Oakland, CA: B-Sides Box Sets, 2017. . Edition of 2000 copies. 50 individual cards in a box. Previously unpublished photographs from House Hunting.
 Bright Black World. Paso Robles, CA: Nazraeli, 2018. . Text by Alexander Nemerov.

Smaller publications by Hido
 Collage Number Three. Deadbeat Club #41. Los Angeles, CA: Deadbeat Club, 2016.  Edition of 500 copies. 8 page zine which folds out to form a poster.
 The Perfect Copy Vol. 1. San Francisco, CA: Colpa, 2016. Six 4-color Risograph photographic prints in screen printed envelope. Edition of 100 copies.

Exhibitions

Solo
 SF Camerawork, San Francisco, CA, 1997
 Cleveland Museum of Art, Cleveland, Ohio, 2002
 Open House, Kemper Museum of Contemporary Art, 2002
 Roaming-New Landscapes, Julie Saul Gallery, 2004
 Unfinished Narratives, Photographic Center Northwest, Seattle, WA, 2006
 House Hunting + Bright Black World, part of Imago Festival, National Museum of Contemporary Art, Lisbon, Portugal, 2020

Group
 Light and Atmosphere, Miami Art Museum, FL, 2004/5
 Suburban Escape, San Jose Museum of Art, San Jose, CA, 2006/7. Work by Hido and 29 other photographers.
 Pier 24: The Inaugural Exhibition, Pier 24 Photography, San Francisco, CA, 2010
 Day & Night, Main Exhibition Copenhagen Photo Festival, Copenhagen, Denmark, 2010
 Here, Pier 24 Photography, San Francisco, CA, 2011/12
 About Face, Pier 24 Photography, San Francisco, CA, 2012/13
 A Sense of Place, Pier 24 Photography, San Francisco, CA, 2013/14
 The Open Road: Photography and the American Road Trip, Crystal Bridges Museum of American Art, Bentonville, AR, 2016. Curated by David Campany and Denise Wolff.
 Collected, Pier 24 Photography, San Francisco, CA, 2016/17

Awards
 1996: Barclay Simpson Award, California College of the Arts, CA. Joinet winner with Geoffrey Chadsey.
 1998: The Wallace Alexander Gerbode Foundation, Visual Arts Award.
 1998: Recent Graduate of Distinction Award, California College of the Arts, CA.
 2001: Eureka Fellowship, Fleishhacker Foundation.
 2002: Best First Monograph of 2001, Photo-Eye.
 2017: In Focus Artist selected by the National Portrait Gallery UK curators, an annual showcase for new work by an internationally renowned photographer

Public collections

Notes

References

General references
 Berwick, Carly. Todd Hido: Julie Saul, ART news, November, pp. 153–154. 2004.
 Helfand, Glen. Todd Hido. (Stephen Wirtz), Artforum International, October 2001.
 Grundberg, Andy. House sitting: the photography of Todd Hido, Artforum, May 1998.

External links
 
 Pier 24 Photography Artist Video: Todd Hido
 'Working in the Vicinity of Narrative: Todd Hido and Darius Himes' from School of Visual Arts. Hido presentation of his career (video)



1968 births
Living people
Photographers from California
20th-century American photographers
21st-century American photographers
California College of the Arts alumni
Artists from the San Francisco Bay Area
Rhode Island School of Design alumni
Tufts University alumni
Photographers from Ohio
People from Kent, Ohio
Educators from Ohio
School of the Museum of Fine Arts at Tufts alumni